The Evacuation of the Crimea (November 13–16, 1920) was an event in the Russian Civil War, in which the Government of South Russia evacuated over sea from the Crimean Peninsula, the last stronghold of the White movement on the Southern Front, bringing an end to the fighting on that Front.

The Evacuation 
During the occupation of Crimea by the Crimean Soviet Army under the command of Pavel Dybenko in April 1919, the Entente troops were evacuated from Sevastopol, taking with them a number of refugees, including some of the leaders of the Second Crimean regional government of Solomon Crimea. White Army units retreated to the Kerch Peninsula and held it. Initially, the Crimean Socialist Soviet Republic and its leaders Dmitry Ulyanov pursued a relatively soft policy in comparison with the atrocities of the winter of 1917-1918 and were able to avoid mass terror.

However, by the end of October 1920, the White Army had been driven out of Southern Russia and Ukraine, and only held the Crimean Peninsula, defended behind the narrow Perekop Isthmus. When this last defensive line was breached by the Red Army during the Siege of Perekop, the commander of the White Army, Pyotr Wrangel, decided to evacuate. The operation had been preliminarily worked out and planned by General Wrangel's staff, so its implementation was carried out in good order.

During the evacuation from the ports of the Crimean peninsula (Sevastopol, Yevpatoria, Kerch, Feodosia, Yalta) a total of 145,693 soldiers and civilians, not counting the crews, were taken on board on 126 ships and "sudenosheks" (small boats and tugs).

This fleet, known as Wrangel's fleet and composed of ships of the Whites' Black Sea fleet, foreign ships, and the temporarily mobilized ships of the Voluntary Fleet, first sailed to Entente-occupied Constantinople. A significant number of the passengers left the ships here, replenishing the ranks of White Russian emigres.  Between December 8, 1920, and February 1921, the reduced flotilla sailed to the Tunisian port of Bizerte.

The soldiers and civilians who were left behind in the Crimea suffered under the Red Terror organised by Béla Kun and Rosalia Zemlyachka, under the general management of the representative of the Russian Soviet government, Yuri Pyatakov, and authorised by Vladimir Lenin.

The estimated number of executions vary from minimum 12,000 over 50,000 to 120,000. The White Army soldiers had been falsely promised amnesty if they surrendered.

Several rare photographs of the moment of evacuation in Sevastopol and Yalta have been preserved. The Crimean Evacuation is also shown in Soviet feature films "Two Comrades Were Serving" (1968) and "The Flight" (1970), and also in the 2014 film "Sunstroke" .

Photographs

References

Battles of the Russian Civil War
Evacuation
Conflicts in 1920
Evacuations